Sara M. Groenevelt (died October 31, 1899) was a litterateur and classical musician. Both her daughters became professional musicians as well.

Early life
Sara Groenevelt was born on the "Bon Dieu", a cotton plantation of her uncle, F. G. Bartlett, which was romantically situated on a bend of the Red river called Bon Dieu, near Natchitoches, Louisiana. She was the daughter of Dr. Sylvanus Bartlett, of Maine, and Julia Finch Gresham, of Kentucky. Groenevelt was a cousin of Ben Washington, the journalist "Perley Poore".

At the age of fifteen she graduated from the girl's high school of New Orleans.

Career
She was the only lady solo-player at the Haupt-Prufung of the Leipzig Conservatory of Music, held in the Gewandhaus in May 1867, where she played with success the Moscheles Concerto for piano, accompanied by the famous Leipzig Gewandhaus Orchestra, Moscheles himself leading.

Groenevelt wrote under various pen-names, and her poems have received recognition from the Louisiana Times-Democrat, and also from the Chicago Current, for which latter she wrote under the pen-name "Stanley M. Bartlett."

She is the author of Otille the Octoroone; Tragedy in Five Acts

Personal life
A few years after graduation, she became the wife of Professor Eduard/Edward F. Groenevelt, Jr. (born June 6, 1827, died May 29, 1899), a descendant of an old Dutch noble, Baron Arnold de Groenevelt, of Netherland fame. Shortly after her marriage she accompanied her husband to Europe, where she spent several years, completing her musical education under the careful guidance of Ignaz Moscheles, Carl Reinecke and other masters.

She died on October 31, 1899, in Berlin, of typhoid fever and is buried at Lafayette Cemetery Number 1, New Orleans, Louisiana.

References

External links

Year of birth missing
1899 deaths
19th-century American musicians
19th-century American writers
19th-century classical musicians
19th-century American women musicians
American classical musicians
American women writers
Burials in Louisiana
Deaths from typhoid fever
People from Natchitoches, Louisiana
Women in classical music
Wikipedia articles incorporating text from A Woman of the Century
19th-century American women